Tony Kelly (born 15 December 1993) is an Irish hurler who plays for Clare Senior Championship club Ballyea and at inter-county level with the Clare county hurling team.

Early life
Kelly attended St Flannan's College in Ennis for his secondary education and as of 2021 works in the school as a teacher as well as coaching the senior hurling team.

Playing career

Clare

Minor and under-21

Kelly first came to prominence on the inter-county scene as a member of the Clare minor team in 2010. He won his first Munster medal that year following a 1-16 to 1-11 defeat of Waterford. Clare subsequently qualified for the All-Ireland decider against Kilkenny, however, Kelly's side faced a narrow 2-10 to 0-14 defeat.

In 2011 Kelly was appointed captain of the Clare minor team. He won a second consecutive Munster medal that year following a 1-20 to 3-9 defeat of Waterford once again. The subsequent All-Ireland semi final saw Clare defeated by Galway after extra time.

Kelly also became a member of the Clare under-21 team in 2011, however they were defeated in the Munster Semi-final by Limerick on a scoreline of 2-19 to 1-15 despite a contribution of 3 points from play from Tony Kelly. This remains Kelly's only defeat in the Munster Minor and Under-21 Championships. Kelly won his first Munster medal in that grade as Clare defeated Tipperary by 1-16 to 1-14 in the 2012 Munster Final in Cusack Park in Ennis. After trailing at half-time, Clare outscored Kilkenny by 1-10 to 0-4 in the second period of play to secure a 2-17 to 2-11 victory in the All-Ireland final of the same year. It was Kelly's first All-Ireland medal in the grade.

Clare dominated the under-21 series once again in 2013. A 1-17 to 2-10 defeat of Tipperary in the provincial decider gave Kelly a second Munster medal. The subsequent All-Ireland saw Clare face first-time finalists Antrim. In a complete mismatch, Clare powered to a 2-28 to 0-12 victory, with Kelly collecting a second consecutive All-Ireland medal.

Senior

Kelly made his senior championship debut at left wing-forward and scoring 1-2 in a 1-16 to 0-16 defeat of Dublin on 7 July 2012.

On 8 September 2013 Kelly lined out against Cork in his first All-Ireland final. Three second-half goals through Conor Lehane, Anthony Nash and Pa Cronin, and a tenth point of the game from Patrick Horgan gave Cork a one-point lead as injury time came to an end. A last-gasp point from corner-back Domhnall O'Donovan earned Clare a 0-25 to 3-16 draw. The replay on 28 September was regarded as one of the best in recent years. Clare's Shane O'Donnell was a late addition to the team, and went on to score a hat-trick of goals in the first nineteen minutes of the game. Horgan top scored for Cork, however, further goals from Conor McGrath and Darach Honan secured a 5-16 to 3-16 victory for Clare. It was Kelly's first All-Ireland medal. He rounded off the season by collecting his first All-Star award, while also becoming the only player in the history of the scheme to have won the Hurler and Young Hurler of the Year awards in the same year.

In June 2014, Kelly featured in the Sky Sports television advert to promote their new broadcasting deal with the GAA.

On 8 May 2016, Clare won the 2016 National Hurling League, their first National Hurling League title since 1978 after a 1-23 to 2-19 win against Waterford in a replay. Kelly scored 1-6 in the game, including two late points to win the game.

On 25 October 2020, Kelly scored 17 points in the first game of the delayed Munster Championship against Limerick, in a game that Clare lost 1-23 to 0-36.
On 7 November 2020, he scored 0-13 against Laois in round 1 of the qualifiers, and a week later scored 1-15 against Wexford in round 2.

Career statistics

Honours

Team

University of Limerick
Fitzgibbon Cup (2) : 2015, 2018

Clondegad
 Clare Under-21 A Football Championship (1) : 2012
 Clare Intermediate Football Championship (1) : 2011
 Clare Minor B Football Championship (1) : 2009

Ballyea
 Munster Senior Club Hurling Championship (1) : 2016
 Clare Senior Hurling Championship (4) : 2016, 2018 (c), 2021, 2022
 Clare Senior B Hurling Championship (1) : 2013
 Clare Under-21 A Hurling Championship (1): 2012
 Clare Under-21 B Hurling Championship (1): 2011
 Clare Minor B Hurling Championship (1) : 2009

Clare
 All-Ireland Senior Hurling Championship (1): 2013
 National Hurling League (1): 2016 (c)
 Munster Senior Hurling League (2): 2016, 2019 (c)
 All-Ireland Under-21 Hurling Championship (3): 2012, 2013, 2014 (c)
 Munster Under-21 Hurling Championship (3): 2012, 2013, 2014 (c)
 Munster Minor Hurling Championship (2): 2010, 2011

Individual

Awards
 GAA-GPA Hurler of the Year (1): 2013
 GAA-GPA Young Hurler of the Year (1): 2013
 GAA-GPA All-Star Award (4): 2013, 2020, 2021, 2022
 The Sunday Game Player of the Year (1): 2013
 The Sunday Game Team of the Year (4): 2013, 2020, 2021, 2022
 Bord Gáis Under-21 All-Star (1) : 2013
 Munster Under-21 Hurler Of The Year (1) : 2012
 Munster Minor Player of the Year (1) : 2011

References

1993 births
Living people
All-Ireland Senior Hurling Championship winners
Ballyea hurlers
Clare inter-county hurlers
Clondegad Gaelic footballers
Irish accountants
People educated at St Flannan's College
All Stars Awards winners (hurling)